Guilalo (also spelled gilalo, jilalo, bilalo, or guilálas), were large native sailing outrigger ships of the Tagalog people in the Philippines. They were common vessels in Manila Bay in the 18th and 19th centuries. They were easily identifiable by their two large settee sails made with woven fiber. They were steered by a central rudder and can be rowed with round-bladed oars.

They ferried passengers and trade goods (like dried fish and fruits) between Manila and Cavite. They were also used in the Batangas region.

They were also sometimes referred to as tafurea (or tarida) in Spanish, due to their similarity in appearance to the Medieval European tafurea, a flat-bottomed sailing ship used to transport horses. They are also sometimes known as "panco", a Spanish general term for bangka.

See also
Balación
Balangay
Casco (barge)
Garay (ship)
Karakoa
Paraw
Salambaw
 Lepa (ship)

References

Indigenous ships of the Philippines